Kalin Yervandovich Stepanyan (born 15 May 1955) is a Russian professional football coach and a former player of Armenian descent.

External links
 

1955 births
Living people
Russian footballers
Soviet footballers
FC Spartak Vladikavkaz players
Russian football managers
Russian people of Armenian descent
FC Oryol players
Association football defenders
FC Spartak-UGP Anapa players